Virgilio Monti (1852–1942) was an Italian painter, active mainly in Rome, painting sacred subjects.

Biography
Among his works are:
Madonna and Child first chapel on right, Santa Brigida, Rome
Holy Family, main altarpiece, Santa Chiara, Rome
Archangel Gabriel (1875) first chapel on right, Santa Maria dell'Orto, Rome
San Giuseppe (1878) first chapel on right, Santa Maria dell'Orto, Rome
San Gioacchino ai Prati di Castello (1892), collaboration with Eugenio Cisterna
Sant'Antonio M Zacaria (1900), San Carlo ai Catinari, Rome 
Sacred Heart of Jesus, Chapel of the Sacred Heart, Basilica di San Nicola da Tolentino, Tolentino

References

1852 births
1942 deaths
19th-century Italian painters
Italian male painters
20th-century Italian painters
19th-century Italian male artists
20th-century Italian male artists